Nee Jathaleka is a 2016 Indian Telugu-language romantic drama film directed by Lawerence Dasari and starring Naga Shaurya, Parul Gulati and Sarayu. This was the first film Naga Shourya shot for and had a delayed release.

Cast 
Naga Shaurya as Akhil
Parul Gulati as Shirley
Sarayu as Swapna

Soundtrack
The music was composed by Swaraj Jedidiah. The songs were shot in Bangkok and Hyderabad. The title song was released in August on Radio City 91.1 FM.

Release
The film was scheduled to release on August 13, but the release was pushed to October 1.

Reception
A critic from Nowrunning wrote that "Finally, Nee Jathaleka has ended up as a forgettable film for Naga Shourya due to the outdated story line, bad performances, and boring narration". A critic from 123Telugu wrote that "The outdated story line, bad performances, and boring narration kill this film completely".  A critic from Full Hyderabad opined that "Nee Jatha Leka is an assault on all the senses".

References